Booge is an unincorporated community in Red Rock Township, Minnehaha County, South Dakota, United States. The community sits on a major route of the Burlington Northern and Santa Fe Railway, and it is a half-way point between Garretson, South Dakota and Manley, Minnesota.

Geography

History
Booge was named after C.A. Booge, an official of the Sioux City and Northern Railroad Company on January 21, 1891. Booge was responsible for getting the railroad line extended into South Dakota.

References

External links
 History of Booge, courtesy of the Argus Leader.

Unincorporated communities in Minnehaha County, South Dakota
Unincorporated communities in South Dakota
Sioux Falls, South Dakota metropolitan area